Shooting at the 1988 Summer Paralympics consisted of 23 events. Because of a three-way tie for third place in the men's air rifle three positions 2-6 event, a total of 25 bronze medals were awarded.

Medal summary

Men's events

Women's events

Mixed events

References 

 

1988 Summer Paralympics events
1988
Paralympics
Shooting competitions in South Korea